Hunger is a prolonged condition in which insufficient amounts of food are available.

Hunger or The Hunger may also refer to:

People
 Saint Hunger (died 866), Bishop of Utrecht (854–866)
 Alfredo Hunger (born 1955), Peruvian former swimmer
 Anna Hunger (active 1938), American science fiction writer
 Daniela Hunger (born 1972), East German double Olympic champion swimmer
 Frank W. Hunger (born 1936), American attorney
 Heiko Hunger (born 1964), German skier
 Herbert Hunger (1914–2000), Austrian Byzantine scholar
 Joachim Hunger (1957–1990), German sailor who competed in two Olympics
 Leo Hunger (1880–1956), American gymnast
 Sophie Hunger (born 1983), Swiss singer/songwriter born Émilie Welti
 Wolfgang Hunger (born 1960), German sailor who competed in three Olympics

Arts and entertainment

Films
 Hunger (1966 film), a Danish film based on Knut Hamsun's novel
 Hunger (1973 film), a Canadian animated short, one of the first CGI films
 The Hunger (1983 film), a horror film starring Catherine Deneuve and David Bowie, based on Whitley Strieber's novel
 Hunger (1986 film), an Australian television film directed by Stephen Wallace
 The Hunger (1986 film), an Egyptian film based on Naguib Mahfouz's novel
 Hunger (2001 film), an American film based on Hamsun's novel
 Hunger (2008 film), a film about Irish hunger striker Bobby Sands, directed by Steve McQueen
 Hunger (2009 film), created by Steven Hentges and written by L.D. Goffigan

Literature
 Hunger (Gone series), the second novel in the Gone series by Michael Grant
 Hunger (el-Bisatie novel), a 2009 novel by Mohamed el-Bisatie
 Hunger (Hamsun novel), an 1890 novel by Knut Hamsun
 Hunger (Kessler novel), a 2010 young-adult novel by Jackie Kessler
 "Hunger" (poem), a poem by Jayanta Mahapatra
 Hunger: A Memoir of (My) Body, a 2017 memoir by Roxane Gay
 The Hunger (Strieber novel), a 1981 vampire novel by Whitley Strieber
 Hunger, a 2010 novel by Elise Blackwell
 Hunger, a 1998 fiction collection by Lan Samantha Chang
 Hunger, a 2002 short-fiction collection by Jane Eaton Hamilton
 Hunger, a comic book miniseries, part of Cataclysm: The Ultimates' Last Stand
 The Hunger, a 2018 historical novel by Alma Katsu about the Donner Party
 The Hunger, a 1986 novel by Naguib Mahfouz
 The Hunger, a book by Lincoln Townley
 Hunger (magazine), a biannual publication by British photographer Rankin

Music

Groups
 Hunger (band), a 1960s American rock band
 The Hunger (band), a 1990s–2010s American rock band

Albums
 Hunger (Frankie & The Heartstrings album), 2011, also the title song
 Hunger (Janis Ian album), 1997, also the title song
 Hunger (The Meteors album), 1980
 The Hunger (Michael Bolton album), 1987, also the title song
 The Hunger (Seven Day Jesus album), 1996, also the title song

Songs
 "Hunger" (Florence and the Machine song), 2018
 "Hunger" (Molly Hammar song), 2016
 "Hunger", by The 69 Eyes from Back in Blood
 "Hunger", by Amaranthe from Amaranthe
 "Hunger", by Aurora from A Different Kind of Human (Step 2)
 "Hunger", by King Kobra from Ready to Strike
 "The Hunger", by the Distillers from Coral Fang
 "The Hunger", by Fireflight from Unbreakable
 "The Hunger", by Steve Holy from Blue Moon
 "The Hunger", by Shirley Manson, written by Serj Tankian
 "The Hunger", by the Misfits from American Psycho

Television
 The Hunger (TV series), a 1997–2000 British/Canadian horror anthology series
 "Hunger" (Dilbert), an episode of Dilbert
 "Hunger" (Legend of the Seeker), an episode of Legend of the Seeker

Other uses
 Hunger (Marvel Comics), a vampire character

See also
 Olaf I of Denmark (c. 1050–1095), king of Denmark nicknamed Olaf Hunger
 Hunger Winter, the Dutch famine of 1944-1945 during World War II
 Hungry (disambiguation)